Goeppertia is a genus of flowering plants in the family Marantaceae, native to the New World Tropics. It contains 243 accepted species, many of which were until recently assigned to Calathea. It was first described by Nees von Esenbeck in 1831, who erroneously erected another genus Goeppertia in 1836, which has now been synonymized with Endlicheria. In 1862 August Grisebach described another genus Goeppertia; this has now been synonymized with Bisgoeppertia.

The genus name of Goeppertia is in honour of Heinrich Göppert (1800–1884), a German botanist and paleontologist.

Species 
The following species are accepted:

Goeppertia ackermannii (Körn.) Borchs. & S.Suárez
Goeppertia acuminata (Steyerm.) Borchs. & S.Suárez
Goeppertia aemula (Körn.) Borchs. & S.Suárez
Goeppertia affinis (Fenzl ex Regel) Borchs. & S.Suárez
Goeppertia albertii (L.H.Bailey & Raffill) Borchs. & S.Suárez
Goeppertia albovaginata (K.Koch & Linden) Borchs. & S.Suárez
Goeppertia allenii (Woodson) Borchs. & S.Suárez
Goeppertia allouia (Aubl.) Borchs. & S.Suárez
Goeppertia altissima (Poepp. & Endl.) Borchs. & S.Suárez
Goeppertia amazonica (H.Kenn.) Borchs. & S.Suárez
Goeppertia angustifolia (Körn.) Borchs. & S.Suárez
Goeppertia annae (H.Kenn. & J.M.A.Braga) Borchs. & S.Suárez
Goeppertia applicata (Jacob-Makoy ex É.Morren) Borchs. & S.Suárez
Goeppertia argyraea (Linden ex J.Dix) Borchs. & S.Suárez
Goeppertia argyrophylla (Linden ex K.Koch) Borchs. & S.Suárez
Goeppertia arrabidae (Körn.) Borchs. & S.Suárez
Goeppertia atropurpurea (Matuda) Borchs. & S.Suárez
Goeppertia attenuata (H.Kenn.) Borchs. & S.Suárez
Goeppertia bachemiana (É.Morren) Borchs. & S.Suárez
Goeppertia bantae (H.Kenn.) Borchs. & S.Suárez
Goeppertia baraquinii (Lem.) Borchs. & S.Suárez
Goeppertia barbata (Petersen) Borchs. & S.Suárez
Goeppertia basiflora (H.Kenn.) J.M.A.Braga
Goeppertia bellula (Linden) Borchs. & S.Suárez
Goeppertia brasiliensis (Körn.) Borchs. & S.Suárez
Goeppertia brevipes (Körn.) Borchs. & S.Suárez
Goeppertia brunnescens (K.Koch) Borchs. & S.Suárez
Goeppertia buchtienii (Pax) Borchs. & S.Suárez
Goeppertia burle-marxii (H.Kenn.) Borchs. & S.Suárez
Goeppertia cannoides (Nicolson, Steyerm. & Sivad.) Borchs. & S.Suárez
Goeppertia capitata (Ruiz & Pav.) Borchs. & S.Suárez
Goeppertia caquetensis (S.Suárez & Galeano) Borchs. & S.Suárez
Goeppertia carolineae (H.Kenn.) J.M.A.Braga
Goeppertia cataractarum (K.Schum.) Borchs. & S.Suárez
Goeppertia chimboracensis (Linden) Borchs. & S.Suárez
Goeppertia chrysoleuca (Poepp. & Endl.) Borchs. & S.Suárez
Goeppertia cinerea (Regel) Borchs. & S.Suárez
Goeppertia cleistantha (Standl.) Borchs. & S.Suárez
Goeppertia clivorum (H.Kenn.) Borchs. & S.Suárez
Goeppertia coccinea (Standl. & Steyerm.) Borchs. & S.Suárez
Goeppertia colombiana (L.B.Sm. & Idrobo) Borchs. & S.Suárez
Goeppertia colorata (Hook.) Borchs. & S.Suárez
Goeppertia communis (Wand. & S.Vieira) Borchs. & S.Suárez
Goeppertia comosa (L.f.) Borchs. & S.Suárez
Goeppertia compacta (S.Suárez & Galeano) Borchs. & S.Suárez
Goeppertia concinna (W.Bull) Borchs. & S.Suárez
Goeppertia concolor (Eichler ex Petersen) Borchs. & S.Suárez
Goeppertia contrafenestra (H.Kenn.) Borchs. & S.Suárez
Goeppertia coriacea (H.Kenn.) Borchs. & S.Suárez
Goeppertia crocata (É.Morren & Joriss.) Borchs. & S.Suárez
Goeppertia cuneata (H.Kenn.) Borchs. & S.Suárez
Goeppertia curaraya (H.Kenn.) Borchs. & S.Suárez
Goeppertia cyclophora (Baker) Borchs. & S.Suárez
Goeppertia cylindrica (Roscoe) Borchs. & S.Suárez
Goeppertia densa (K.Koch & Linden) Borchs. & S.Suárez
Goeppertia dicephala (Poepp. & Endl.) Borchs. & S.Suárez
Goeppertia dilabens (L.Andersson & H.Kenn.) Borchs. & S.Suárez
Goeppertia dodsonii (H.Kenn.) Borchs. & S.Suárez
Goeppertia donnell-smithii (K.Schum.) Borchs. & S.Suárez
Goeppertia dorothyae (J.M.A.Braga & H.Kenn.) J.M.A.Braga
Goeppertia dressleri (H.Kenn.) Borchs. & S.Suárez
Goeppertia dryadica (J.M.A.Braga) Borchs. & S.Suárez
Goeppertia eburnea (André & Linden) Borchs. & S.Suárez
Goeppertia ecuadoriana (H.Kenn.) Borchs. & S.Suárez
Goeppertia effusa Saka & Lombardi
Goeppertia eichleri (Petersen) Borchs. & S.Suárez
Goeppertia elegans (H.Kenn.) Borchs. & S.Suárez
Goeppertia elliptica (Roscoe) Borchs. & S.Suárez
Goeppertia enclitica (J.F.Macbr.) Borchs. & S.Suárez
Goeppertia erecta (L.Andersson & H.Kenn.) Borchs. & S.Suárez
Goeppertia eximia (K.Koch & C.D.Bouché) Borchs. & S.Suárez
Goeppertia exscapa (Poepp. & Endl.) Borchs. & S.Suárez
Goeppertia fasciata (Linden ex K.Koch) Borchs. & S.Suárez
Goeppertia fatimae (H.Kenn. & J.M.A.Braga) Borchs. & S.Suárez
Goeppertia flavescens (Lindl.) Borchs. & S.Suárez
Goeppertia foliosa (Rowlee ex Woodson & Schery) Borchs. & S.Suárez
Goeppertia fragilis (Gleason) Borchs. & S.Suárez
Goeppertia fucata (H.Kenn.) Borchs. & S.Suárez
Goeppertia gandersii (H.Kenn.) Borchs. & S.Suárez
Goeppertia gardneri (Baker) Borchs. & S.Suárez
Goeppertia gloriana (H.Kenn.) Borchs. & S.Suárez
Goeppertia gordonii (H.Kenn.) F.Silva & J.M.A.Braga
Goeppertia grandis (Petersen) Borchs. & S.Suárez
Goeppertia granvillei (L.Andersson & H.Kenn.) Borchs. & S.Suárez
Goeppertia grazielae (H.Kenn. & J.M.A.Braga) Borchs. & S.Suárez
Goeppertia guianensis (Klotzsch ex Benth. & Hook.f.) Borchs. & S.Suárez
Goeppertia gymnocarpa (H.Kenn.) Borchs. & S.Suárez
Goeppertia hammelii (H.Kenn.) Borchs. & S.Suárez
Goeppertia hieroglyphica (Linden & André) Borchs. & S.Suárez
Goeppertia humilis (S.Moore) Borchs. & S.Suárez
Goeppertia hylaeanthoides (H.Kenn.) Borchs. & S.Suárez
Goeppertia incompta (H.Kenn.) Borchs. & S.Suárez
Goeppertia indecora (Woodson) Borchs. & S.Suárez
Goeppertia inocephala (Kuntze) Borchs. & S.Suárez
Goeppertia insignis (W.Bull ex W.E.Marshall) J.M.A.Braga, L.J.T.Cardoso & R.Couto
Goeppertia jagoriana (Regel) Borchs. & S.Suárez
Goeppertia jocosa (J.F.Macbr.) Borchs. & S.Suárez
Goeppertia joffilyana (J.M.A.Braga) Borchs. & S.Suárez
Goeppertia kappleriana (Körn. ex Horan.) Borchs. & S.Suárez
Goeppertia kegeljanii (É.Morren) Saka
Goeppertia killipii (L.B.Sm. & Idrobo) Borchs. & S.Suárez
Goeppertia koernickeana (Regel) J.M.A.Braga
Goeppertia kummeriana (É.Morren) Borchs. & S.Suárez
Goeppertia laetevirens (Huber) Borchs. & S.Suárez
Goeppertia lagoagriana (H.Kenn.) Borchs. & S.Suárez
Goeppertia lanata (Petersen) Borchs. & S.Suárez
Goeppertia lasiophylla (H.Kenn.) Borchs. & S.Suárez
Goeppertia lasseriana (Steyerm.) Borchs. & S.Suárez
Goeppertia latifolia (Willd. ex Link) Borchs. & S.Suárez
Goeppertia legrelleana (Linden) Borchs. & S.Suárez
Goeppertia leonae (Sander) Borchs. & S.Suárez
Goeppertia leonoriae (Lascur., H.Oliva & Avendaño) Borchs. & S.Suárez
Goeppertia leucostachys (Hook.f.) Borchs. & S.Suárez
Goeppertia libbyana (H.Kenn.) Borchs. & S.Suárez
Goeppertia liesneri (H.Kenn.) Borchs. & S.Suárez
Goeppertia lietzei (É.Morren) Saka
Goeppertia lindbergii (Petersen) Borchs. & S.Suárez
Goeppertia lindeniana (Wallis) Borchs. & S.Suárez
Goeppertia lindmanii (K.Schum.) Borchs. & S.Suárez
Goeppertia littoralis (Körn.) Borchs. & S.Suárez
Goeppertia loeseneri (J.F.Macbr.) Borchs. & S.Suárez
Goeppertia longibracteata (Lindl.) Borchs. & S.Suárez
Goeppertia longiflora (H.Kenn.) Borchs. & S.Suárez
Goeppertia longipetiolata (H.Kenn.) Borchs. & S.Suárez
Goeppertia louisae (Gagnep.) Borchs. & S.Suárez
Goeppertia luciani (Linden) Borchs. & S.Suárez
Goeppertia maasiorum (H.Kenn.) Borchs. & S.Suárez
Goeppertia macilenta (Lindl.) Borchs. & S.Suárez
Goeppertia macrosepala (K.Schum.) Borchs. & S.Suárez
Goeppertia majestica (Linden) Borchs. & S.Suárez
Goeppertia makoyana (É.Morren) Borchs. & S.Suárez
Goeppertia mandioccae (Körn.) Borchs. & S.Suárez
Goeppertia mansoi (Körn.) Borchs. & S.Suárez
Goeppertia marantifolia (Standl.) Borchs. & S.Suárez
Goeppertia martinicensis (Urb.) Borchs. & S.Suárez
Goeppertia matudae (H.Kenn. & Ganders) Borchs. & S.Suárez
Goeppertia mediopicta (Jacob-Makoy ex É.Morren) Borchs. & S.Suárez
Goeppertia mendesiana Saka & Popovkin
Goeppertia metallica (Planch. & Linden) Borchs. & S.Suárez
Goeppertia micans (L.Mathieu) Borchs. & S.Suárez
Goeppertia microcephala (Poepp. & Endl.) Borchs. & S.Suárez
Goeppertia mirabilis (Jacob-Makoy ex É.Morren) Borchs. & S.Suárez
Goeppertia misantlensis (Lascur.) Borchs. & S.Suárez
Goeppertia mishuyacu (J.F.Macbr.) Borchs. & S.Suárez
Goeppertia modesta (Brongn. ex Gris) Borchs. & S.Suárez
Goeppertia monophylla (Vell.) Borchs. & S.Suárez
Goeppertia multicincta (H.Kenn.) Borchs. & S.Suárez
Goeppertia neblinensis (H.Kenn.) Borchs. & S.Suárez
Goeppertia neoviedii (Petersen) Borchs. & S.Suárez
Goeppertia nidulans (L.B.Sm. & Idrobo) Borchs. & S.Suárez
Goeppertia nigricans (Gagnep.) Borchs. & S.Suárez
Goeppertia nigrocostata (Linden & André) Borchs. & S.Suárez
Goeppertia nitidifolia (H.Kenn.) Borchs. & S.Suárez
Goeppertia nobilis (K.Koch) Borchs. & S.Suárez
Goeppertia oblonga (Mart.) Borchs. & S.Suárez
Goeppertia orbifolia (Linden) Borchs. & S.Suárez
Goeppertia ornata (Linden) Borchs. & S.Suárez
Goeppertia ovandensis (Matuda) Borchs. & S.Suárez
Goeppertia ovata (Nees & Mart.) Borchs. & S.Suárez
Goeppertia pachystachya (Poepp. & Endl.) Borchs. & S.Suárez
Goeppertia pacifica (Linden & André) Borchs. & S.Suárez
Goeppertia pallidicosta (H.Kenn.) Borchs. & S.Suárez
Goeppertia panamensis (Rowlee) Borchs. & S.Suárez
Goeppertia paucifolia (H.Kenn.) Borchs. & S.Suárez
Goeppertia pavonii (Körn.) Borchs. & S.Suárez
Goeppertia pavonina (K.Koch & Linden) Borchs. & S.Suárez
Goeppertia pearcei (Rusby) Borchs. & S.Suárez
Goeppertia peregrina (H.Kenn.) J.M.A.Braga
Goeppertia peruviana (Körn.) Borchs. & S.Suárez
Goeppertia petersenii (Eggers) Borchs. & S.Suárez
Goeppertia picturata (K.Koch & Linden) Borchs. & S.Suárez
Goeppertia pittieri (K.Schum.) Borchs. & S.Suárez
Goeppertia plicata (H.Kenn.) Borchs. & S.Suárez
Goeppertia poeppigiana (Loes. ex H.Kenn.) Borchs. & S.Suárez
Goeppertia porphyrocaulis (W.Bull) Borchs. & S.Suárez
Goeppertia portobelensis (H.Kenn.) Borchs. & S.Suárez
Goeppertia praecox (S.Moore) Borchs. & S.Suárez
Goeppertia prolifera (Vell.) Borchs. & S.Suárez
Goeppertia propinqua (Poepp. & Endl.) Borchs. & S.Suárez
Goeppertia pruinata (W.Bull) Borchs. & S.Suárez
Goeppertia pseudoveitchiana (H.Kenn.) Borchs. & S.Suárez
Goeppertia pulchella Borchs. & S.Suárez
Goeppertia pumila (Vell.) Borchs. & S.Suárez
Goeppertia regalis (Rollison ex Lem.) Borchs. & S.Suárez
Goeppertia reginae (J.M.A.Braga) Borchs. & S.Suárez
Goeppertia rhizanthoides (H.Kenn.) J.M.A.Braga
Goeppertia robin-fosteri (H.Kenn.) Borchs. & S.Suárez
Goeppertia robiniae (H.Kenn.) Borchs. & S.Suárez
Goeppertia rodeckiana (K.Schum.) Borchs. & S.Suárez
Goeppertia roseobracteata (H.Kenn.) Borchs. & S.Suárez
Goeppertia roseopicta (Linden ex Lem.) Borchs. & S.Suárez
Goeppertia rossii (Körn.) Borchs. & S.Suárez
Goeppertia rufibarba (Fenzl) Borchs. & S.Suárez
Goeppertia sanderiana (Sander) Borchs. & S.Suárez
Goeppertia saxicola (Hoehne) Borchs. & S.Suárez
Goeppertia schunkei (H.Kenn.) Borchs. & S.Suárez
Goeppertia sciuroides (Petersen) Borchs. & S.Suárez
Goeppertia selbyana (H.Kenn.) Borchs. & S.Suárez
Goeppertia sellowii (Körn.) Borchs. & S.Suárez
Goeppertia silvicola (H.Kenn.) Borchs. & S.Suárez
Goeppertia silvosa (J.F.Macbr.) Borchs. & S.Suárez
Goeppertia singularis (H.Kenn.) Borchs. & S.Suárez
Goeppertia soconuscum (Matuda) Borchs. & S.Suárez
Goeppertia sophiae (Huber) Borchs. & S.Suárez
Goeppertia sousandradeana (H.Kenn. & Ganders) Borchs. & S.Suárez
Goeppertia sphaerocephala (K.Schum.) Borchs. & S.Suárez
Goeppertia splendida (Lem.) Borchs. & S.Suárez
Goeppertia squarrosa (L.Andersson & H.Kenn.) Borchs. & S.Suárez
Goeppertia standleyi (J.F.Macbr.) Borchs. & S.Suárez
Goeppertia steyermarkii (H.Kenn. & Nagata) Borchs. & S.Suárez
Goeppertia straminea (Petersen) Borchs. & S.Suárez
Goeppertia stromanthifolia (Rusby) Borchs. & S.Suárez
Goeppertia subtilis (S.Moore) Borchs. & S.Suárez
Goeppertia tinalandia (H.Kenn.) Borchs. & S.Suárez
Goeppertia trichoneura (H.Kenn.) Borchs. & S.Suárez
Goeppertia truncata (Link ex A.Dietr.) Borchs. & S.Suárez
Goeppertia tuberosa (Vell.) Borchs. & S.Suárez
Goeppertia ucayalina (Huber) Borchs. & S.Suárez
Goeppertia ulotricha (J.F.Macbr.) Borchs. & S.Suárez
Goeppertia umbrosa (Körn.) Borchs. & S.Suárez
Goeppertia undulata (Linden & André) Borchs. & S.Suárez
Goeppertia ursina (Standl.) Borchs. & S.Suárez
Goeppertia vaginata (Petersen) Borchs. & S.Suárez
Goeppertia varians (K.Koch & L.Mathieu) Borchs. & S.Suárez
Goeppertia variegata (K.Koch) Borchs. & S.Suárez
Goeppertia veitchiana (Veitch ex Hook.f.) Borchs. & S.Suárez
Goeppertia velutina (Poepp. & Endl.) Borchs. & S.Suárez
Goeppertia venusta (H.Kenn.) Borchs. & S.Suárez
Goeppertia verapax (Donn.Sm.) Borchs. & S.Suárez
Goeppertia verecunda (H.Kenn.) Borchs. & S.Suárez
Goeppertia villosa (Lindl.) Borchs. & S.Suárez
Goeppertia vinosa (H.Kenn.) Borchs. & S.Suárez
Goeppertia violacea (Lindl.) J.M.A.Braga & F.Silva
Goeppertia virginalis (Linden ex Regel) Borchs. & S.Suárez
Goeppertia wallisii (Linden) Borchs. & S.Suárez
Goeppertia warszewiczii (Lem.) Borchs. & S.Suárez
Goeppertia whitei (Rusby) Borchs. & S.Suárez
Goeppertia widgrenii (Körn.) Borchs. & S.Suárez
Goeppertia williamsii (J.F.Macbr.) Borchs. & S.Suárez
Goeppertia wiotii (É.Morren) Borchs. & S.Suárez
Goeppertia yoshida-arnsiae N.Luna & Saka
Goeppertia zebrina (Sims) Nees
Goeppertia zingiberina (Körn.) Borchs. & S.Suárez

References

 
Flora of Mexico
Flora of Central America
Flora of the Caribbean
Flora of northern South America
Flora of western South America
Flora of Brazil
Flora of Paraguay
Flora of Northeast Argentina